Phạm Văn Tiến (born 30 April 1993) is a Vietnamese footballer who plays as a goalkeeper for V.League 2 club Bà Rịa Vũng Tàu.

Honours

International

Vietnam U23
 Third place : Southeast Asian Games: 2015

References

1993 births
Living people
Vietnamese footballers
Hoang Anh Gia Lai FC players
V.League 1 players
People from Quảng Nam province
Association football goalkeepers
Southeast Asian Games bronze medalists for Vietnam
Southeast Asian Games medalists in football
Competitors at the 2015 Southeast Asian Games